Mount Harvey, is a mountain in the Britannia Range of the North Shore Mountains just northeast of the Village of Lions Bay, British Columbia, Canada.

Name origin
Like nearby Mount Brunswick, which is Mount Harvey's line parent in prominence terms, and like other placenames in the Howe Sound region, the mountain was named in associated with the marine battle of 1794 known as the Glorious First of June. Such names were conferred by Captain Richards of  during his survey of the region in 1859.

References

North Shore Mountains
One-thousanders of British Columbia